is the sixth single by the Japanese girl idol group Team Syachihoko, released in Japan on May 14, 2014 by Unborde Records (Warner Music Japan).

Release details 
The single was released in four versions: a regular edition, Nagoya (a version that will only be distributed in Nagoya), Yarou Edition, and Otome Edition.

Track listing

Nationwide (Regular Edition)

Nagoya venue Limited Edition

Yarou Limited Edition

Otome Limited Edition

Charts

References

External links 
 Warner Music Japan profiles
 Nationwide Edition (Regular Edition)
 Nagoya & Venue Limited edition
 Yarou Limited edition
 Otome Limited edition

2014 singles
2014 songs
Japanese-language songs
Team Syachihoko songs
Unborde singles